Ivan Strahilov Kyuchukov (born 1 February 1946) is a Bulgarian football midfielder and later manager.

References

1946 births
Living people
Bulgarian footballers
PFC Lokomotiv Plovdiv players
Association football midfielders
Bulgarian football managers
Karşıyaka S.K. managers
PFC Levski Sofia managers
Altay S.K. managers
Bulgarian expatriate football managers
Expatriate football managers in Turkey
Bulgarian expatriate sportspeople in Turkey